Francisco Ricardo Soberón Garrido is a human rights leftist activist in Peru. In 1983 he founded APRODEH, the non-governmental organization of which he is currently a director. He previously led the National Human Rights Coordinator's Office and was a member of the steering committee of the Coalition for the International Criminal Court. He was Vice President for South America of the International Federation of Human Rights from 1997 to 2001. He was awarded the National Order of Merit by the French government and the Letelier-Moffitt Human Rights Award by the Institute for Policy Studies.

References
Speak Truth to Power-Telling Stories PBS
Peru putting human rights at risk, groups say Reuters Mon May 5, 2008
Kerry Kennedy, Kerry Kennedy Cuomo, Eddie Adams, Nan Richardson  (2003) Speak Truth to Power: Human Rights Defenders Who Are Changing Our World

Living people
People from Lima
Peruvian human rights activists
Year of birth missing (living people)